Claude Serre (10 November 1938 – 13 November 1998) was a French cartoonist born in Sucy-en-Brie, Val-de-Marne.  

After academic studies, he studied the craft of stained glass for eight years under Max Ingrand, along with his cousin Jean Gourmelin. He then started drawing cartoons and became an illustrator for many French journals, including Plexus, Planet, Hara-Kiri, Lui, Pariscope and La Vie Electrique. He also began illustrating books. The first was Asunrath, a work of fantasy, published by Losfeld. He incorporated his interest in the fantastic into many of his early lithographs, which were published, sometimes exclusively, in many countries including Japan and Germany. He also participated in both group and solo exhibitions. 

In 1969 he met Jack Claude Nezat, and they became friends. Nezat wrote numerous articles devoted to his art and his work and organized two exhibitions in Germany in 1975 and 1976-1977 that met with great success. This relationship also allowed Serre to work with the magazine Pardon. Serre, meanwhile, started drawing cartoons on such topics as medicine, sports, automobiles and DIY, and his first book of cartoons, Black Humor and Men in White, satirising medical professionals, was published in 1972 by Editions Grésivaudan. The book won the Black Humor prize. A number of similar themed books in the same vein were published by Glénat of Grenoble. He also continued to work as an illustrator and worked in particular on books by Francis Blanche and Frederic Dard, author of the San Antonio series. 

Serre died of a brain tumour at the age of 60 in Caen, Calvados.

Bibliography
Albums (Glénat, Editor in Grenoble, France)
 1981 : L'automobile  - The car
 1983 : Savoir vivre 
 1985 : Petits anges  - Little angels
 1986 : Zoo au logis 
 1988 : Rechute 
 1991 : La forme olympique - Olympic form
 1995 : Chasse et pêche 
 1995 : La chasse (coffret édition de luxe)
 1995 : La pêche (coffret édition de luxe)
 1996 : Faites vos jeux (en collaboration avec Bridenne)
 1997 : Le dico des maux
 Tome 1: traitements et remèdes (préface Frédéric Dard) 
 1999 : Coffret animaux
 1999 : Coffret autobrico
 1999 : L'humour chronique de Serre
 2001 : Humour noir et hommes en blanc - Black humor and men in white
 2001 : Le livre d'or de Serre - Serre's golden book
 2002 : Le sport - Sport
 2002 : Vice compris 
 2002 : Le bricolage 
 2003 : Musiques - Music
 2003 : La bouffe
 2004 : Les vacances
 2004 : La forme olympique
 2005 : Petits anges

External links
 Official Claude Serre web site

1938 births
1998 deaths
People from Sucy-en-Brie
French cartoonists
French caricaturists